"Let's Get Down" is a song by British electronic duo Supafly vs. Fishbowl. It was released in August 2005 as a single and reached the top 30 in the UK and Australia.

Chart positions

References 

2005 singles
2005 songs
Supafly songs
Universal Music Group singles